Erethistoides ascita is a species of South Asian river catfish endemic to Nepal where it is found in the Mechi and Kosi River systems, Ganges drainage and in rivers of lowland plains of southeastern Nepal.  This species grows to a length of  SL.

References
 

Erethistidae
Fish of Asia
Taxa named by Heok Hee Ng
Taxa named by David R. Edds
Fish described in 2005